Varjan may refer to:

 Falavarjan
 Verjan